Croco is a common abbreviation of Crocodile (disambiguation).

Croco may refer to
 the River Croco in England
 an animal of the Crocodile species
 a train stop of the French Le Crocodile train signaling
 a variant of the historic name Chrocus